The A3 is a Belgian motorway (mainly classified as the E40) extending from the east of Brussels (Boulevard Reyers), through Leuven, onwards to Liège. Just past the ring of Liège, the motorway continues to Verviers, Eupen and the German border.

The section between Liège (intersection of Hauts-Sarts) and the German border is part of the King Baudouin Motorway (Baldwin König Autobahn in German and Koning Boudewijnsnelweg in Dutch). Crossing the Hesbaye (French) or Haspengouw (Dutch), the Walloon section between Leuven and Liège is named the Hesbignonne.

Pictures 

Motorways in Belgium